The 1967 Hong Kong riots were large-scale anti-government riots that occurred in Hong Kong during British colonial rule. Beginning as a minor labour dispute, the demonstrations eventually escalated into protests against the British colonial government. The protests were also partially inspired by riots that had occurred just a few months prior in Portuguese Macau, known as the 12-3 incident, which were ultimately much more successful on the side of the protesters.

The use of roadside bombs and petrol bombs by protesters prompted the Hong Kong Police Force to raid the demonstrators' strongholds and arrest their leaders. Several demonstrators, as well as a few police officers, were killed in the subsequent violence. As many of the bombs were made in communist-leaning schools, then governor David Trench decided to close those schools and banned communist publications in the colony.

The protests occurred in the backdrop of the Cultural Revolution taking place in mainland China (i.e. People's Republic of China or PRC), with many of the protesters harbouring leftist views and sympathies towards the Chinese Communist Party (CCP). It was the first series of riots since the 1956 and 1966 Hong Kong riots. After the riots, the British Hong Kong government publicly reflected on its failure to address certain social grievances and carried out major social reforms. However, another riot would occur in 1981.

Tensions 
The initial demonstrations and riots were labour disputes that began as early as May 1967 in shipping, taxi, textile, cement companies and in particular the Hong Kong Artificial Flower Works, where there were 174 pro-CCP trade unionists. The unions that took up the cause were all members of the Hong Kong and Kowloon Federation of Trade Unions, a labour group with strong ties to Beijing.

The political climate was tense in Hong Kong in the spring of 1967. Across the colony's northern border was a tumultuous PRC, with Red Guards carrying out purges and engaging in infighting. To the west of Hong Kong, in the Portuguese colony of Macau, two months of violent clashes between colonial police and pro-CCP demonstrators had just ended. Order was not restored to Macau despite the intervention of the Portuguese army, and a general strike in January 1967 pressured the Portuguese government into agreeing to many of the demonstrators' demands, placing the colony under the de facto control of the PRC. The tension in Hong Kong was heightened by the ongoing Cultural Revolution to the north. Up to 31 protests were held.

Outbreak of violence 

In May, a labour dispute broke out in a factory producing artificial flowers in San Po Kong.

Picketing workers clashed with management, and riot police were called in on 6 May. In violent clashes between the police and the picketing workers, 21 workers were arrested; many more were injured. Representatives from the union protested at police stations, but were themselves also arrested.

The next day, large-scale demonstrations erupted on the streets of Hong Kong. Many of the pro-CCP demonstrators carried Little Red Books in their left hands and shouted communist slogans. The Hong Kong Police Force engaged with the demonstrators and arrested another 127 people. A curfew was imposed and all police forces were called into duty.

In the PRC, newspapers praised the demonstrators' activities, calling the British colonial government's actions "fascist atrocities". In Hong Kong, pro-Beijing newspapers Ta Kung Pao and Wen Wei Po similarly voiced their support for the demonstrators and opposition to the British colonial government.

In Hong Kong's Central District, large loudspeakers were placed on the roof of the Bank of China Building, broadcasting pro-CCP rhetoric and propaganda, prompting the British authorities to retaliate by putting larger speakers blaring out Cantonese opera. Posters were put up on walls with slogans like "Blood for Blood", "Stew the White-Skinned Pig", "Fry The Yellow Running Dogs", "Down With British Imperialism" and "Hang David Trench", a reference to the then governor, David Trench. Students distributed newspapers carrying information about the disturbances and pro-CCP rhetoric to the public.

On 16 May, the activists formed the "Committee of Hong Kong and Kowloon Compatriots from All Circles for Struggle Against British Hong Kong Persecution" or "Anti-British Struggle Committee" for short. Yeung Kwong of the Hong Kong and Kowloon Federation of Trade Unions was appointed as its chairman. The committee organised and coordinated a series of large demonstrations. Hundreds of supporters from 17 different leftist organisations demonstrated outside Government House, chanting communist slogans. At the same time, many workers went on strike, with Hong Kong's transport services being disrupted particularly badly.

More violence erupted on 22 May, with another 167 people being arrested. The rioters began to adopt more sophisticated tactics, such as throwing stones at police or vehicles passing by, before retreating into leftist "strongholds" such as newspaper offices, banks or department stores once the police arrived. Casualties began soon after. At least eight deaths of the protestors were recorded before 1 July, mostly shot or beaten to death by the police.

Height of violence 

On 8 July, several hundred demonstrators from the PRC, including members of the People's Militia, crossed the frontier at Sha Tau Kok and attacked the Hong Kong Police, of whom five were shot dead and eleven injured in the brief exchange of fire. The People's Daily in Beijing ran editorials supporting the leftist struggle in Hong Kong; rumours that the PRC was preparing to take over control of the colony began to circulate. The leftists tried in vain to organise a general strike; attempts to persuade the ethnic Chinese serving in the police to join the pro-CCP movement were equally unsuccessful.

The leftists retaliated by planting bombs, as well as decoys, throughout the city. Normal life was severely disrupted and casualties began to rise. An eight-year-old girl, Wong Yee-man, and her two-year-old brother, Wong Siu-fan, were killed by a bomb wrapped like a gift placed outside their residence. Bomb disposal experts from the police and the British forces defused as many as 8,000 home-made bombs, of which 1,100 were found to be real. These were known as "pineapple bombs". Most police stations across Hong Kong were fortified with sandbags as police facilities were the target of numerous attacks using bombs, homemade fragmentation explosives, and various projectiles.

The Hong Kong government imposed emergency regulations, granting the police special powers in an attempt to quell the unrest. Leftist newspapers were banned from publishing; leftist schools alleged to be bomb-making factories, such as Chung Wah Middle School, were shut down; many activist leaders were arrested and detained; and some of them were later deported to mainland China.

On 19 July, demonstrators set up barbed wire defences on the 20-storey Bank of China Building (owned by the PRC government).

In response, police raided activist strongholds, including Kiu Kwan Mansion. In one of the raids, helicopters from HMS Hermes – a Royal Navy aircraft carrier – landed police on the roof of the building. Upon entering the building, the police discovered bombs and weapons, as well as a leftist "hospital" complete with dispensary and an operating theatre.

The public outcry against the violence was widely reported in the media, and the activists again switched tactics. On 24 August, Lam Bun, a popular anti-leftist radio commentator, was murdered by a death squad posing as road maintenance workers as he drove to work with his cousin. Lam's assailants prevented him from getting out of his car, and he was burned alive.

Other prominent figures of the media who had voiced opposition against the riots were also threatened, including Louis Cha, then chairman of the Ming Pao newspaper, who left Hong Kong for almost a year before returning.

The waves of bombings did not subside until October 1967. In December, Chinese Premier Zhou Enlai ordered the leftist groups in Hong Kong to stop all bombings, and the riots in Hong Kong finally came to an end. The disputes in total lasted 18 months.

It became known much later that, during the riots, the commander of PLA's Guangzhou Military Region Huang Yongsheng (one of Lin Biao's top allies) secretly suggested invading and occupying Hong Kong, but his plan was vetoed by Zhou Enlai.

Aftermath

Casualties 
By the time the rioting subsided at the end of the year, 51 people had been killed, of whom at least 22 were killed by the police, and 15 died in bomb attacks, with 832 people sustaining injuries, while 4979 people were arrested and 1936 convicted. Millions of dollars in property damage resulted from the rioting, far in excess of that reported during the 1956 riot. Confidence in the colony's future declined among some sections of Hong Kong's populace, and many wealthy residents sold their properties and migrated overseas, particularly to places such as Australia, Singapore and Canada.

Reactions 

On 22 August, in Beijing, thousands of people demonstrated outside the office of the British chargé d'affaires, before Red Guards attacked, ransacked, and burned down the main building.

Many leftist groups with close ties to the PRC were dissolved during and after the 1967 riots. The murder of radio host Lam Bun, in particular, outraged many Hong Kong residents and discredited the leftist movement in Hong Kong as a whole. The credibility of the PRC and its local sympathisers among Hong Kong residents was severely damaged for more than a generation.

Social reforms 
The 1966 and 1967 riots in Hong Kong served as a catalyst for social reforms in Hong Kong with the end of positive non-interventionism in 1971, while David Trench grudgingly  introduced some social reforms. It was not until the governorship of Murray MacLehose in the 1970s that the scope of reforms was greatly expanded, transforming the lives of those living in Hong Kong and marking the emergence of Hong Kong as one of the Four Asian Tigers, as well as the emergence of the "Lion Rock Spirit", said to be the "core values of Hong Kong people".

Legacy 
The Hong Kong Police Force was applauded for its behaviour during the riots by the British Government. In 1969, Queen Elizabeth granted the force the privilege of the "Royal" title. This remained in use until the end of British rule in 1997.

A number of participants in the 1967 riots have since gained a foothold in Hong Kong politics. For instance, Tsang Tak-sing was a rioter who later co-founded the largest pro-Beijing political party in the city, the Democratic Alliance for the Betterment and Progress of Hong Kong. Along with his brother Tsang Yok-sing, they continued to promote Marxism in Hong Kong. In 2001, Yeung Kwong was awarded the Grand Bauhinia Medal by then chief executive Tung Chee-hwa, a symbolic gesture that raised controversy as to whether the post-1997 Hong Kong government of the time was supportive of the riots.

In 2017, hundreds of protesters who took part in the 1967 riots were hailed as heroes in a memorial ceremony at Wo Hop Shek public cemetery to mark the 50th anniversary of the uprising. Prominent attendees included former finance sector lawmaker Ng Leung-sing, the Hong Kong Federation of Trade Unions' Michael Luk Chung-hung, and head of the 67 Synergy Group Chan Shi-yuen. They called for Beijing to vindicate the protests, which they have continued to refer to as a "patriotic act against British colonial tyranny".

Police website revisionism controversy 
In mid-September 2015, media reported that the Hong Kong Police Force had made material deletions from its website concerning "police history", in particular, the political cause and the identity of the groups responsible for the 1967 riots, with mention of communists being expunged.

For example, "Bombs were made in classrooms of leftist schools and planted indiscriminately on the streets" became "Bombs were planted indiscriminately on the streets"; the fragment "waving aloft the Little Red Book and shouting slogans" disappeared, and an entire sentence criticising the hypocrisy of wealthy pro-Beijing businessmen, the so-called "red fat cats" was deleted.

The editing gave rise to criticisms that it was being sanitised, to make it appear that the British colonial government, rather than activists, were responsible. Stephen Lo, the new Commissioner of Police, said the content change of the official website was to simplify it for easier reading; Lo denied that there were any political motives, but his denials left critics unconvinced. The changes were subsequently reversed.

Depictions in media 
 In John Woo's action film Bullet in the Head, the 1967 riots are briefly shown.
 In Tsui Hark's film Dangerous Encounters of the First Kind, images of the 1967 riots are shown.
 In the stage play and film I Have a Date with Spring, the riots (although only briefly referenced) are a key plot point.
 Wong Kar Wai's film 2046 features the riots in the background and uses a few old newsreels of the riots.
 The film about modern Hong Kong history Mr. Cinema depicts the riots.

See also 

 1960s in Hong Kong
 Scientia Secondary School
 Pui Kiu Middle School
 Fukien Secondary School
 Chung Ying Street
 1956 Hong Kong riots
 12-3 incident, in Macau
 1966 Hong Kong riots
 Spring Garden Lane
 1971 JVP Insurrection, in Ceylon (present-day Sri Lanka)
 1981 Hong Kong riots
 1989 Tiananmen Square protests and massacre, in mainland China

References

Further reading 

 
 
 
  – PhD thesis of the University of Hong Kong

External links 

 Remaking Hong Kong, the 1967 People's Revolution
 The Sha Tau Kok Incident 1967

 
Cultural Revolution
Riots
1967 riots
67 Riots
67 Riots
Mass murder in 1967
Murder in Hong Kong
Protests in Hong Kong
Protests in China
Resistance to the British Empire
67 Riots
1967 protests
1967 crimes in Hong Kong
1967 murders in Asia
1960s murders in Hong Kong
Political repression in Hong Kong